Fire Force or Fireforce is a variant of the military tactic of vertical envelopment of a target by helicopter-borne and parachute infantry developed by the Rhodesian Security Forces during the Rhodesian Bush War. Regiments involved included the Rhodesian Light Infantry or RLI, the Rhodesian African Rifles and the Rhodesian Special Air Service or SAS assisted by the Rhodesian Air Force. The Fire Force counterinsurgency missions were designed to trap and eliminate Zimbabwe African National Liberation Army and Zimbabwe People's Revolutionary Army insurgents before they could flee.

Fire Force reacted to enemy ambushes, farm attacks, or observation post (OP) sightings, and could also be called in by trackers or patrols who had made contact with the enemy and then called for reinforcements. Fire Force was first deployed in January 1974, and saw its first action a month later on 24 February 1974.

Fire Force was an operational assault or response usually composed of a first wave of 32 soldiers carried to the scene by three helicopters (G-Cars) and one Dakota (Paradak), with a command/gunship helicopter (K-Car) and a light attack aircraft in support (Lynx). One of the advantages of the Fire Force was its flexibility, as all that was needed was a reasonable airstrip.

Four-man stick 
Unlike conventional military units, Fire Force troops were broken down into 'sticks' of 4 men instead of the usual 8 or 9-man sections. The reason for the 4-man stick was because the Rhodesian Air Force Alouette III helicopters could only carry 4 men.

Of the 4 men, one was the Stick Leader, with an A63 or A76 VHF radio, a FN FAL, 100 rounds (7.62×51mm NATO) and several types of grenades. One was the machine gunner, with a FN MAG machine-gun and carrying 400 rounds. The other two were riflemen with a FN FAL and 100 rounds, grenades and rifle grenades. Grenades carried were usually one M962 HE grenade, one M970 white phosphorus grenade, a smoke grenade, one or two rifle grenades and an Icarus rocket flare each.

One of the riflemen was a fully trained combat medic and carried a medical pack. Every man also carried a saline drip. Rifles were zeroed for 100m, and sights were set to the same range. Every third or fourth round loaded into the rifle magazine was a tracer. During 1979 one of these two men was issued a radio. Pistols were optional and all paratroopers were entitled to carry a Belgian FN Hi-Power or Spanish Star Model B 9×19mm pistol. Each soldier also carried a lightweight sleeping bag in a mat pack on his back.

A single Stick made up the stop groups (stops), patrols, ambushes and often sweep lines, although larger sweep lines could be made up from para-sticks or by combining the sticks positioned by the G-Cars, or from those sticks transported by the "Landtail". In all formations, the MAG gunner was next in position to the Stick Leader.

Aircraft 

The Fire Force would be based at an airfield with usually four helicopters, one Dakota and a light attack aircraft (known as the "Lynx").

The helicopters were Alouette IIIs (in 1979 a few Agusta-Bell 205As 'Cheetahs' were used) of which one was equipped with a MG 151/20 20mm cannon and flown by the senior pilot. The cannons were equipped with trays, which took 200 or 400 high explosive incendiary (HEI) rounds. This helicopter was called the 'K-Car' (K denoting Kill / Command) and had a crew of three (pilot, gunner/technician (gunner-tech), and Fire Force commander).

Some K-Cars (known as Dalmatian K-Cars) were armed with four Browning .303 (7.7 mm) machine guns (instead of the 20mm cannon) but were not popular with the troops, as they were less effective. The numbers of enemy personnel killed by the K-Car in a scene varied from zero to all. The K-Car would carry a spare FN FAL to replace any malfunctioning rifle and two A63/A76 VHF radios, a spare for the ground troops and one for the commander in case he had to disembark the K-Car. With him in the K-Car, he would carry the radio codes and in particular the daily Shackle code. All would don flak jackets to protect them from ground fire.

The other three helicopters were known as 'G-Cars' (G denoting Gunship) and were armed with machine guns (originally one FN MAG replaced with twin Browning .303 machine guns each) with 500 rounds per gun and carried the 4-man Sticks along with its pilot and technician (called a 'tech') who also operated its machine guns. The G-Cars had headsets for the stick leaders to keep them abreast of developments while in the air. The G-cars were also used for casualty evacuation and resupplying the Fire Force troops with ammunition and equipment.

The Dakota carried five Sticks. Two on the port side, three on the starboard. Apart from the parachutes the equipment was identical to the heli-sticks. The gunner had to jump with his machine gun strapped to his side and carrying 400 rounds.

The Reims-Cessna FTB 337G 'Lynx' was the main light attack aircraft used on Fire Force missions. The Lynx's were armed with twin Browning .303 machine guns mounted above the wing and 37mm SNEB rockets, locally made Mini "Alpha" Bombs (cluster bombs), Mini "Golf" Bombs ( blast and shrapnel bomb) and Frantans (frangible napalm drop tank). The Percival Provost Mk 52 was originally used in the light attack role before the Lynx came into service. Hunter ground-attack fighter jets, Canberra light bombers and more rarely, Vampire fighter-bombers were on 24-hour standby should a Fire Force encounter stiff resistance.

In 1979 the 'Jumbo' Fire Force came into being. The Jumbo Fire Force was created by bringing two Fire Forces together, giving it two K-Cars, eight G-Cars, a Dakota and a Lynx, often with the support of Hunter ground-attack fighter jets.

Tactics 
The standard Fire Force assault consisted of one K-car, three G-cars, a Dakota and the Lynx. Often there was no Dakota involved or more G-cars. When in 1979 Cheetahs (the Bell Hueys) were introduced, a Fire Force might go into action with two or three of these, each carrying two (sometimes three) stops. There were many times when no Lynx was used.

The Fire Force (of which there were only three main ones most of the time) had responsibility for huge swathes of Rhodesia (many thousands of square miles each). A commando of the Rhodesian Light Infantry or an infantry company of the Rhodesian African Rifles would be designated as a Fire Force at a forward airfield for six weeks, or sometimes, several months. By 1977, all Rhodesian regular infantry were trained paratroops and would in turn be deployed by helicopter or parachute or brought in as reinforcements from the vehicles of the 'land-tail'.

Any sightings of the enemy within the Fire Force zone were reported and a siren sounded in the base. Eight sticks (32 men) were deemed the "First Wave". The First Wave troops rushed to their helicopters (after donning their webbing). The Paratroopers went first to the tent where their equipment and parachutes were held and the dispatchers and off-duty comrades would help them kit out. Normally the Second Wave (or Landtail) rushed to the trucks, although if "jousting" or if the contact area was nearby, they would wait at the airfield to be picked up by the G-cars after the First Wave had been dropped off.

Troops alternated as Heliborne, Paratroopers, Landtail and Off-duty throughout a Bush Trip. The Landtail was often an important factor in the refuelling of helicopters and recovering of deceased persons (enemy and civilian), parachutes and enemy weapons and equipment. Sometimes there was a small third wave if numbers permitted. Quite often only the First Wave was involved in the action. In general, most soldiers preferred to be in the Heliborne First Wave.

Arrival on target 
The K-Car was always the first to arrive at the scene. The K-Car Commander had to first attempt to confirm the precise area where the enemy had been spotted by the OP. Usually, the terrain was extremely broken and covered in vegetation, which made this task particularly difficult. The K-Car Commander then had to make a plan—where to position the first stops, where to make the main sweep, and in what direction. The first troops to arrive were always transported in by the G-Cars, which followed the K-Car in column (sometimes a long way behind, for they were a little slower than the K-car). Sometimes the sticks were dropped immediately, but on many occasions, the G-Cars would circle the scene several times (to the delight of the troops) before the commander made his final decisions.

Very often the K-car occupants would see the enemy (or any perceived enemy), and then the Helicopter Gunner/Technician would attack them with his 20 mm cannon, using bursts of two to four shells (but no more than five). The accuracy of this firing was extraordinary, due to the machine flying in tight anticlockwise circles just a few hundred feet above the ground. The 20 mm cannon poked out of the port side, thus there was no "lead in", and the exploding high-velocity shells would impact right next to and often on their intended targets. Very few persons caught by this fire were ever found alive by the troops.

Usually, the G-Car sticks were positioned in areas where the enemy would most likely run through (often a riverbed or dry "donga"), where there was more vegetation, therefore attempting to surround or cut off enemy movement. If there was a hill or ridge that gave outstanding observation, then more than one stick might be placed there. Sometimes G-car sticks would form the main sweep line immediately after they were deployed instead of the Paras, depending on the circumstances at hand. The G-Cars would make dummy landings to confuse the enemy while placing men in cut-off or stop positions.

Whilst the K-Car was looking for or engaging the enemy, the commander also had to decide on where to drop the Para-sticks and direct any strikes by the Lynx. The Lynx usually initiated the attack. The Drop Zone (DZ) position was of course dictated by the enemy's own position, and the terrain, but often there would be no clear DZ nearby, in which case the Para-sticks would be dropped a mile or so away to be picked up and repositioned by the G-Cars. This firing was always ineffective, as no troops were ever hit. There was also a great variation on the dropping patterns of these sticks, as sometimes they were all dropped at once, sometimes individually, or any combination thereof.

Positioning the main sweep 
Whilst all this was taking place, one of the commander's main concerns was where the main sweep would occur. In a perfect scenario, the Para-sticks would form the main sweep, and the G-Car sticks would carry out blocking actions. In reality, there was vast variation, so there was little difference in being Para, or in the First Wave Helicopter assault. First Wave strikes in the G-cars however were generally the best stops to be in for those wishing action.

The most important factors (apart from the reaction of the enemy and the terrain) in a Fire Force operation were firstly the reliability of the sighting of the enemy and secondly the skill of the Fire Force commander. In the former case, the majority of successful contacts were due to the skills of the Selous Scouts (many of which were the former enemies). They had the capacity to insert observation posts (OPs) into the bush without being noticed by the inhabitants. In the latter case, the difficulty of commanding the scene was extreme and good Fire Force commanders were highly prized by the troops.

How soon the enemy heard the approaching helicopters and his reaction to it was of course decisive. Wind direction and speed, the presence of a tree-covered ridgeline or a multitude of other factors would make the difference between life or death. Where he was caught in unfavourable terrain for him (like a village surrounded by open ground) he had no chance and normally none escaped (unless it was near nightfall).

Although the number of operational parachute jumps was remarkable, the majority of troops were carried into action by helicopter.

There were many times when the exiting from G-cars was dangerous, due (for example) to them being unable to descend close enough because of trees and troops had to clamber out and hold on to the steps and drop from too great a height, with mass leaves and twigs whirling about the inside of the machine and great stress of pilot and tech. The Alouettes were much more capable of dropping off stops in rough terrain than the Bells, though they had less carrying capacity and range and speed. The Alouettes were extremely reliable (they had a tendency to sway a little as the troops jumped).

The twin-Browning .303 machine guns of the G-Cars were never indiscriminately fired by the tech. The K-Car Gunners had to be careful, for there was always a shortage of 20mm rounds (they cost around $25 each) and there were many times when friendly troops were only meters away from the target.

Tracers, smoke or phosphorus grenade, or miniflare (pencil flare) were used as the "Fireball" to mark a target for strike aircraft. A 37mm SNEB shoulder-launched marker rocket was locally developed and used by the Selous Scouts to identify an enemy position.

Sweep 
Each stick made a sweep every time it moved to a new location. This meant (usually) all four soldiers moving in a sweepline (extended line) formation, spaced apart according to the terrain. In flat open land, this may mean as much as twenty-five metres or so. In heavy vegetation, this dropped to several metres. Even then it was common to lose sight of comrades, pushing alone through the denseness. It was more effective to be spaced as far apart as possible.

Whether in the main sweep (which might be composed of any number of sticks available) or in a sticks sweep, the tactics were the same and very simple, to sweep ahead observing your line of sight ahead through the bush and undergrowth.

The speed of this movement varied. Where it was thought (usually deemed by the commander) the enemy lurked, the sweep would slow very much. When the troops sensed the enemy ahead the sweep became even slower, edging forward inch by inch, rifles held at chest level, pointed ahead with the safety catch off. MAG gunners would bear the gun at the hip, held by a sling from their shoulders.

Usually encounters with the enemy were resolved with great speed (a typical Fire Force action could take hours, whilst a firefight might take just a few seconds). In the great majority of cases, the enemy were killed outright by swift shooting (sometimes hand grenades were used). In responding to sudden incoming fire, a sweep or patrol would immediately return fire from either the prone position or from down on one knee, depending on the nature of the surrounding bush.

A deliberate attacking movement called a "Skirmish" was carried out, ending in a run-through of the enemy position. Three basic skirmishing techniques were employed, usually by Sweep lines containing a few Sticks. The first method of skirmishing involved splitting the Sweep line into two equal sections, called flanks, with one flank moving forward while the second flank covered the first. When the first flank went prone and restarted shooting, the second flank would then run forward until some meters past the line of the first, and so on. This method is the least likely to result in a friendly fire incident, but it is also the easiest to counter.

The second skirmish option had every second member of the sweep line designated as one of the flanks, with each member of that flank passing between and through members of the other. The covering flankers stopped shooting as those moving forward passed them.

The third option was called a Pepper Pot. This involved individuals of the Sweep line or Stick, randomly getting up and moving forward, or, going prone and covering, and so on. It is more difficult to implement when in larger numbers, but is also the hardest to counter because prone troops rise from their positions in a very random and seemingly uncoordinated fashion. Sticks of four always used something resembling the Pepper Pot when on the assault, or split pairs if a serious attempt at out-flanking the enemy position was intended.

Prisoners were taken on occasion. Although they were requested to take prisoners wherever possible, in a close-quarter firefight and in thick bush, it was sometimes difficult to determine an enemy's intentions. Prisoners were usually extremely valuable as they might reveal important intelligence to Special Branch or Selous Scouts. Captured guerrillas were frequently turned to work for the Rhodesian Security Forces, sometimes as Auxiliary Forces (Pfumo Re Vanhu) from 1979.

Stop position 
The other main experience was for an individual stick to sweep to a position thought most likely to intercept a fleeing enemy, and stay there, sometimes for up to several hours (perhaps being moved around and maybe later on joining the main sweep). More often than not nothing happened but on many occasions one or more of the enemy came down the (usual) stream bed, or nearby.

If there was a clear view then it was easy, once again just a few seconds shooting. Sometimes the process was repeated in the same spot, with fire being opened a bit earlier. Sometimes the enemy were seen behind in which case the stick immediately pursued. There were many occasions where the action was not so tidy due to terrain/vegetation, or even the sunlight blinding them.

Communication 
Radios were reasonably light and reliable. Most importantly they were easy to use. Headsets were not used normally just a telehand tied to a shoulder strap. An extremely efficient form of radio speech known as Voice Procedure was used. Troops were expected to have a high degree of self-initiative and reliance. For example, if a stick leader desired, two riflemen would be detached to perform a mini-sweep (or stop position) of their own (and perhaps even an individual go off on his own). The introduction of the second radio in 1979 merely confirmed this practice.

Each heli-borne stick was giving the call-sign 'Stop' suffix by a number. Stop-1 was assigned to the first G-car, stop-2 to the second, stop-3 to the third. Para sticks call-signs were 'Banana' suffix by a number. Banana-1 to Banana-5 were in the Dakota. Colour codes suffix by a number were selected for aircraft, e.g.: G-Car One might become Yellow-1. The Fire Force commander's call-sign was usually a two-digit number ending in nine, e.g.: 39 (pronounced three-nine).

To mark a target for air strike, a commanded would be sent to "Send Fireball".

The most important hand-signals were: Thumb up, meaning "friend", Thumb down to indicate "enemy" and Palm down on head to say "come to me".

Importance of air power 
Fire Force without air power is inconceivable. As the enemy did not have air power and was unable to shoot down significant numbers of aircraft (remarkably few helicopters, and no Dakotas were shot down in this conflict, though at least one Dakota was damaged by enemy fire in flight), Fire Force operations were invincible as long as the infantry performed correctly. The movement of the circling helicopters was enough to drown out the sound of the dropped attackers (there was no shouting or talking in the sweeps) so that often they surprised the hiding defenders, in effect ambushing them.

The terrain varied wildly, from villages surrounded by open fields on flat plains, to dense vegetation amongst huge boulders on mountain slopes. Usually there was plenty of cover. Where the enemy ran and a stick had been placed by the Fire Force commander in the right place the hunt was usually easy. The difficult thing was to walk up to the enemy hiding in a house or cave or behind a boulder and kill or capture him. Though the event was shocking (and often results in one or more civilians being killed), it is far more efficient than firing or dropping ordnance from air and overall reduces civilian casualties.

As contact was made typically with 6 to 12 insurgents, this force level of 32 gave the Fire Force a 3–1 ratio of superiority on the ground. The Fire Force quickly yielded an 80–1 kill rate by trapping the enemy and eliminating them by air and ground fire.

See also 
Operation Dingo
Rhodesian African Rifles
Rhodesian Armoured Corps
Rhodesian Army
Rhodesian Bush War
Rhodesian Light Infantry
Rhodesian Special Air Service
Royal Rhodesian Air Force
Selous Scouts

General:
Air assault
Vertical Envelopment

References 
Notes

Further reading

External links 
Counter-Strike from the Sky
Fire Force
List of Combat Parachute Jumps 

Military units and formations of Rhodesia
Rhodesian Bush War
Airborne units and formations
Military parachuting
Paratroopers
Counterinsurgency